Jalan Prof. Dr. Satrio or Jalan Satrio is one of main streets of Jakarta, Indonesia. The road has many important commercial buildings and shopping centers. It is named after former Minister for Health of Indonesia, Major General (Ret.) Prof. Dr. Satrio. This is a 2.25 km long road that extends from Karet Sudirman, Tanah Abang, Central Jakarta to Casablanca Tunnel, Kuningan, South Jakarta. The road is located within the Golden Triangle of Jakarta. The road crosses 4 urban villages and has access point for Mega Kuninngan.

Important buildings
Sampoerna Strategic Square
Arena Futsal	
The Satrio Tower
Ciputra Group Head Office
ITC Kuningan
Mall Ambasador	
NISP Tower ( Bank NISP )	
Ciputra World Jakarta
Kuningan City	
Somerset Grand Citra Residence
Hotel Manhattan Jakarta	
Danamon Tower ( Bank Danamon Indonesia )
Malaysian Embassy
Cyber2 Tower 
BTPN Tower 	
Bank Muamalat

Intersections
The road has 4 intersections:
Junction at Karet Sudirman (towards Tanah Abang , Thamrin and Semanggi )
East West intersection near the Satrio roundabout (towards Jalan Jenderal Gatot Subroto and Karet Pedurenan)
Mega Kuningan Gate (towards Mega Kuningan )
Intersection of Casablanca (towards Dukuh Atas, Casablanca and Tendean / Pacoran )

Transport
TransJakarta, feeder route Karet-Tebet.
Kopaja, S602 Ragunan-Tanah Abang

See also

History of Jakarta
Golden Triangle of Jakarta
Mega Kunnigan

References

 Berkmoes, R.V. et al. ¨Indonesia¨. Lonely Planet, 2010.

Roads of Jakarta
Central Jakarta
South Jakarta